NGC 3605 is an elliptical galaxy located in the constellation Leo. It was discovered on March 14, 1784 by the astronomer William Herschel.

A relatively low-mass galaxy, it is a member of the Leo II Group of galaxies, including NGC 3607 among others.

References

External links 
 

Leo (constellation)
3605
Elliptical galaxies
034415